The 2004 UEFS Futsal Men's Championship was the sixth UEFS futsal European championship held in Baranovichi (Belarus), with 8 national teams.

European Union of Futsal (UEFS) organizes the European Championship biennially.

Teams

First round

Group A

Group B

Final round 

7-8 places

5-6 places

Semifinals

3-4 places

Final

Final standings

See also
UEFS Futsal Men's Championship
European Union of Futsal

External links
UEFS website

UEFS Futsal Men's Championship
UEFS
International futsal competitions hosted by Belarus
UEFS